Interjectio columbiella is a species of snout moth described by James Halliday McDunnough in 1935. It is found in the US states of California and Nevada.

References

Moths described in 1935
Phycitinae